Abram William Foote (October 24, 1862 – May 14, 1941) was a Vermont businessman and politician. He served as the 53rd lieutenant governor of Vermont from 1921 to 1923.

Early life
Abram William Foote was born in Cornwall, Vermont on October 24, 1862. He was educated in Middlebury, and went to Middlebury Union High School.

Business career
Foote was a farmer and businessman, with interests in banking, insurance and other companies. He organized the Cornwall Telephone Company and built the first line from Addison County to Burlington, a venture he later sold to New England Telephone. In 1908, he organized the Rutland County Telephone Company, of which he served as General Manager.

Political career

A Republican, he served in several local offices in Cornwall and was a member of the Vermont House of Representatives from 1900 to 1902. Foote was elected Addison County Assistant Judge in 1902, and reelected in 1904. He again won election to the Vermont House in 1914, serving one term. Foote won election to the Vermont Senate in 1916, serving from 1917 to 1919. In 1920, he was elected Lieutenant Governor and served from 1921 to 1923.

In 1922, Foote ran unsuccessfully for the Republican nomination for governor, losing to Redfield Proctor Jr. Foote served in the Vermont House of Representatives again from 1931 to 1933.

Foote was a delegate to the 1928 Republican National Convention.

Death and legacy
Foote died in Middlebury, Vermont on May 14, 1941, and was buried in West Cornwall's Evergreen Cemetery. He was the grandfather of Ralph A. Foote, who served as Lieutenant Governor from 1961 to 1965.

Published works 
 The Foote Family, Comprising The Genealogy and History of Nathaniel Foote Of Weathersfield, Conn. And His Descendants, Marble City Press, The Tuttle Co., Volume 1, 1907

References 

1862 births
1941 deaths
People from Cornwall, Vermont
Lieutenant Governors of Vermont
Republican Party Vermont state senators
Republican Party members of the Vermont House of Representatives
Vermont state court judges
Burials in Vermont
Businesspeople from Vermont